Ryan E. Mackenzie  is a politician from Pennsylvania. A member of the Republican Party, he represents the 187th Legislative District in the Pennsylvania House of Representatives.

Committee assignments for 2021-22 Legislative Session 
 Consumer Affairs Committee
 Environmental Resources and Energy Committee
 Government Oversight Committee, majority chairman
 Labor and Industry Committee, Subcommittee on Workforce Development chairman
 State Government Committee, Subcommittee on Campaign Finance and Elections chairman

U.S. House campaigns
In 2017, Mackenzie announced he would run for the United States House of Representatives in Pennsylvania's 15th congressional district in 2018. He withdrew from the race in March 2018 when the state Supreme Court created new district lines.

Electoral history

References

External links

State Representative Ryan Mackenzie: official caucus site
Ryan Mackenzie (R): official PA House site
Ryan Mackenzie for State Representative: official campaign site

Living people
21st-century American politicians
Harvard Business School alumni
Republican Party members of the Pennsylvania House of Representatives
New York University alumni
Year of birth missing (living people)